Gregor Schnitzler (born 1964) is a German film director. He directed more than fifteen films since 1991. His best-known films are What to Do in Case of Fire? and The Cloud based on the novel by Gudrun Pausewang.

His father, Conrad, was well known for his work in experimental music and for being an early member of both Tangerine Dream and Cluster (spelled Kluster during his period with the group.)

Selected filmography

References

External links
 

1964 births
Living people
Mass media people from Berlin